Dancourt is a commune in the Seine-Maritime department in the Normandy region in northern France.

Geography

Heraldry

Population

Places of interest
 A fifteenth-century stone cross.
 The church of St. Aubin, dating from the eighteenth century.
 The chapel of Notre-Dame, at Béthencourt.

See also
Communes of the Seine-Maritime department

References

Communes of Seine-Maritime